Cameron Keith Collier (born November 20, 2004) is an American baseball third baseman in the Cincinnati Reds organization. He played college baseball for the Chipola Indians.

Amateur career
Collier grew up in Austell, Georgia and attended Mount Paran Christian School in Kennesaw, Georgia. He committed to play college baseball at Louisville after his freshman year of high school. As a sophomore, Crawford hit for a .434 average with 13 home runs, 40 RBIs, and 19 stolen bases. Collier played in the Perfect Game Junior National Showcase after the season. He was originally considered to be one of the best prospects in the 2023 Major League Baseball draft class. After his sophomore year Collier earned his General Educational Development (GED) and reclassified to the class of 2022.

After reclassifying, Collier enrolled at Chipola College in Marianna, Florida. He was named to the watchlist for the Golden Spikes Award entering his freshman season. Collier batted .333 with eight home runs and 47 RBIs in his freshman season. After the 2022 season, he played collegiate summer baseball for the Cotuit Kettleers of the Cape Cod Baseball League.

Professional career
The Cincinnati Reds selected Collier in the first round, with the 18th overall selection, of the 2022 Major League Baseball draft. On July 25, 2022, Collier agreed to a $5 million contract with the Reds.

Personal life
Collier's father, Lou Collier, played in MLB and the Korea Baseball Organization.

References

External links

Chipola Indians bio

2004 births
Living people
Baseball third basemen
Chipola Indians baseball players
Baseball players from Georgia (U.S. state)
Cotuit Kettleers players
African-American baseball players